Zich may refer to:
 Zich, Ilam
 Zich, Lorestan